Aswin Crist (born 9 July 1994) is an Indian first-class cricketer who plays for Tamil Nadu. He took the most wickets in the 2016–17 Vijay Hazare Trophy, with a total of 20 dismissals from 9 matches.

References

External links
 

1994 births
Living people
Indian cricketers
Tamil Nadu cricketers
Cricketers from Chennai
Tamil sportspeople